Asante Agyemang (born June 1, 1993) is a Ghanaian professional footballer who plays as defender for Maltese football club Għajnsielem.

Club career

Early career
Born in Accra, Asante Agyemang began his youth career with Young Goldfields FC in Sunyani, Ghana.

Bechem United 
On 1 January 2016, Agyemang left Young Goldfields FC to sign for Ghana Premier League club Bechem United. He served as the captain of the Ghanaian football club.

Mufulira Wanderers F.C. 
On 18 May 2019, it was announced Agyemang had signed for Zambian Premier League club Mufulira Wanderers after a successful over five-year stint with Bechem United.

Ghajnsielem 
In October 2019, Agyemang signed a two-year contract with Maltese club Għajnsielem as a free agent.

Honour

Club 
Bechem United 
 2016- Ghanaian FA Cup

References

External links
 

1993 births
Living people
Footballers from Accra
Ghanaian footballers
Ghana international footballers
Bechem United FC players
Ghanaian expatriate footballers
Association football defenders
Expatriate footballers in Malta
Ghanaian expatriate sportspeople in Malta
Maltese Premier League players